Dchagyris nigrescens is a moth of the family Noctuidae. It is found in south and central Europe, the Near East and the Middle East. There is one generation per year and the adults are on wing from May to June. nigrescens was formerly regarded as an aberration of Dichagyris forcipula which it closely resembles.

External links
Noctuinae of Israel
Lepiforum.de

nigrescens
Moths described in 1887
Moths of Asia
Moths of Europe
Taxa named by Gabriel Höfner